Bernadett Dira (born 8 April 1980) is a Hungarian biathlete. She competed in the women's sprint event at the 1998 Winter Olympics.

References

1980 births
Living people
Biathletes at the 1998 Winter Olympics
Hungarian female biathletes
Olympic biathletes of Hungary
Place of birth missing (living people)